Dash Feshal (also Romanized as Dāsh Feshal and Dāsh Feshel; also known as Dāsh Fīshal, Fashal Dash, Feshal, Feshal Dāsh, and Mīshah) is a village in Qarah Quyun-e Shomali Rural District, in the Central District of Showt County, West Azerbaijan Province, Iran. At the 2006 census, its population was 93, in 26 families.

References 

Populated places in Showt County